This is a list of coaches of the California Seals, Oakland Seals and California Golden Seals. Eight men coached the Seals from their creation for the 1967–68 NHL season until the team moved to Cleveland, Ohio after the 1975–76 NHL season. Fred Glover had two stints as coach of the Seals. Bert Olmstead is the only Seals coach inducted in the Hockey Hall of Fame.

Coaches

Key

See also

 List of NHL head coaches

References
General

 

Specific

California Golden Seals head coaches
Head coaches